This is a list of cricketers who have represented Quetta Gladiators in the Pakistan Super League since the first season of the PSL in 2016. Players are listed alphabetically using the standard naming format of their country of origin followed by the year(s) that they have been active as a Quetta player.

For a list of current players see the current squad.

A
 Ahmed Shehzad (2016-2017; 2020)
 Aizaz Cheema (2016-2018)
 Akbar-ur-Rehman (2016)
 Anamul Haque (2017)
 Anwar Ali (2016-2021)
 Jofra Archer (2018)
 Asad Shafiq (2016-2018)
 Mohammad Azam Khan (2018-2021)
 Ahsan Ali (2019; 2022)

B
 Bismillah Khan (2016-2017)
 Carlos Brathwaite (2018)
 Dwayne Bravo (2019)

E
 Elton Chigumbura (2016-2016)
 Grant Elliott (2016)
 Rayad Emrit (2017)
 Sean Ervine (2017)

F
 Faraz Ahmed (2018)
 Fawad Ahmed (2019)

H
 Mir Hamza (2017-2018)
 Hasan Khan (2017-2018)
 John Hastings (2018)
  Harry Gurney (2019)

M
 Mahmudullah (2017-2018)
 Nathan McCullum (2016-2017)
 Mohammad Nawaz (2016-2019)
 Tymal Mills (2017)
 Ghulam Mudassar (2019)
 Mohammad Asghar (2019)
 Mohammad Hasnain (2019)
 Mohammad Irfan (2019)

N
 Mohammad Nabi (2016-2017)
 Noor Wali (2017)

P
 Thisara Perera (2017)
 Kevin Pietersen (2016-2018)

R
 Rahat Ali (2018)
 Rameez Raja (2016, 2018)
 Rashid Khan (2018)
 Rilee Rossouw (2017-2019)
 Jason Roy (2018)

S
 Saad Ali (2018)
 Saad Nasim (2016-2017)
 Kumar Sangakkara (2016)
 Sarfraz Ahmed (2016-2019)
 Saud Shakeel (2018-2019)
 Shane Watson (2018-2019)
 Sohail Tanvir (2019)
 Dwayne Smith (2019)

U
 Umar Amin (2017-2018)
 Umar Gul (2016-2017)
 Umar Akmal (2019; 2022)

W
 Luke Wright (2016-2017)
 Morne van Wyk (2017)

Z
 Zulfiqar Babar (2016-2017)

References

Quetta Gladiators
Quetta Gladiators